Buglossoides  is a genus consisting of 15 species of annual or perennial herbs, native to Europe and Asia. They grow naturally in habitats ranging from sunny scrub to rocky slopes and woodland areas. These plants are covered in fine bristles or hairs. The stems are upright or sprawling, branched or unbranched, with simple oval to lance-shaped leaves. The small funnel-shaped flowers have flaring lobes and are usually blue or white. Perennial species that are rhizomatous can become invasive and difficult where conditions are suitable.

Cultivation
They are suitable for wild and woodland gardens. Grow this plant in moist well-drained soil that is neutral to alkaline. Propagate from seed, cuttings or by division.

Species
Buglossoides arvensis (syn Lithospermum arvense)
Buglossoides calabra
Buglossoides czernjajevii
Buglossoides gasparrinii
Buglossoides minima
Buglossoides purpurocaerulea (syn Lithospermum purpurocaeruleum)
Buglossoides tenuiflora (syn Lithospermum tenuiflorum)
Buglossoides zollingeri (syn Lithospermum zollingeri)

See also
Lithospermum

References
Lord, Tony (2003) Flora : The Gardener's Bible : More than 20,000 garden plants from around the world. London: Cassell. 
Botanica Sistematica

Boraginoideae
Boraginaceae genera